Glamanand International India is a national beauty pageant in India that annually selects representative to compete in Miss International, one of the Big Four major international beauty pageants. The pageant also selects representatives to Miss Grand International and Miss Multinational, an international pageant organized by the Glamanand group.

Glamanand Supermodel India is one of the three major pageants of India having one of the Big four franchise under the national pageant. Nikhil Anand, the founder and CEO of Glamanand Group, serves as one of the National Directors.

The reigning Glamanand Supermodel India 2022 (Miss International India) is Kashish Methwani, who was crowned by the outgoing titleholder Zoya Afroz.

History
India's representatives to the Miss International beauty pageant was initially selected by the Eve's Weekly Miss India contest, since its inception in 1960, until the year 1988. 

Since the year 1991, Femina Miss India sent Indian delegates to compete at Miss International, and was successful in producing two first runner-ups and one second runner-up titles. The last highest placement of Femina Miss India's representative at Miss International was achieved by Shonali Nagrani, who was crowned as the first runner-up in Miss International 2003. The Times Group dropped the franchise of Miss International in 2015. The last representative to Miss International by the Miss India Organization was Jhataleka Malhotra in 2014.

The Glamanand Group acquired the rights to send India's delegates to the Miss International in the year 2015. The first edition of this pageant was held on 4 November 2015 at Courtyard Marriott Hotel, New Delhi. Supriya Aiman became the first delegate to win the title of Glamanand Miss International India. From 2015 onwards, Glamanand Supermodel India is now responsible for the selection of future Miss International India.

Glamanand Supermodel India Winners from 2014–present

Representatives to international pageants

Color key

Miss International
Since 2015, the Glamanand Group acquired the rights to select India's representatives at the Miss International beauty pageant.

Miss Grand International 
Glamanand Group selected India's representative exclusively for the 8th and 10th editions of Miss Grand International.

Miss Teen International
Glamanand Group has been selecting India's representatives for this pageant since the year 2018.

Miss Multinational
Miss Multinational is a New Delhi-based international beauty pageant organized by Glamanand Entertainment. The pageant was first held in 2017.

Miss Tourism World 
Glamanand Group has been selecting India's representatives for this pageant since the year 2017.

Former franchise

Miss Earth
From 2015 to 2018, Glamanand Supermodel India had the franchise to send India's representatives to the Miss Earth pageant.

See also
List of beauty pageants in India

References

External links
 Glamanand Supermodel India - Official website
 
 

India
Beauty pageants in India
Annual events in India
2017 establishments in India
Indian awards
India